John Hercules Duus (1906-1991) was an athlete who competed for England.

Athletics career
Duus competed in the javelin at the 1934 British Empire Games in London and was part of the Manchester Athletic Club.

References

1906 births
1991 deaths
English male javelin throwers
Athletes (track and field) at the 1934 British Empire Games
Commonwealth Games competitors for England